Prince Aleksey Ivanovich Gorchakov (– ) was a Russian general and statesman from the Gorchakov family.

Biography
Aleksey Gorchakov was a son of Prince Ivan Gorchakov and a sister of the noted Russian generalissimo Alexander Suvorov. Born in Moscow, he enlisted in the Lifa Guard Preobrazhensk Regiment in 1774, and began his service several years later in 1781. In 1786 he entered the regular army as a captain and served with distinction (as an adjudant) under his uncle Suvorov in the Turkish War of 1787–92. Gorchakov distinguished himself in the campaigns of 1789 at Akerman, at Ochakov, the latter for which he received the Order of St. George (4th class) as well as being promoted to lieutenant colonel and becoming an adjudant to Prince Potemkin, at Kaumany, at Bender and in the campaign of 1790. In 1790 he was promoted to colonel of Azov regiment. In 1792 he fought in the Poland (Polish–Russian War of 1792) and received the Order of St. Vladimir (4th class).

Gorchakov took part as a general officer in the Italian and Swiss operations of 1799 together with general Rimsky-Korsakov. He returned to Russia afterwards, and became chef of the Neva Musketeer Regiment on 7 February 1800, while serving as the governor of Vryborg as well as the chef of the Vryborg Garrison regiment between March and August in 1800. He then served in the next war against Napoleon in Poland in 1806–1807 (Battle of Heilsberg). He succeeded Barclay de Tolly as the Minister of War in August 1812, and was promoted to general of the infantry on 11 September 1814. Removed from command in December 1815 after another accusation of "embezzlement", he took a discharge in September 1817. Aleksey Gorchakov died in December 1817 in St. Petersburg.

Family
His brother Andrei Ivanovich Gorchakov (1776–1855) was a general in the Russian army who took a conspicuous part in the final campaigns against Napoleon. Their cousin Princess Pelageya Nikolayevna Gorchakova (1762–1838) was fictionalized by her grandson Leo Tolstoy in War and Peace.

References

Sources
 
 

1769 births
1817 deaths
Military personnel from Moscow
People from Moskovsky Uyezd
Aleksey Ivanovich
Members of the State Council (Russian Empire)
Generals of the infantry (Russian Empire)
Russian people of the Polish–Russian War of 1792
Russian commanders of the Napoleonic Wars
Recipients of the Order of St. George of the Third Degree
Recipients of the Order of St. Vladimir, 4th class
Recipients of the Order of St. Anna, 1st class
Recipients of the Gold Sword for Bravery
Commanders Cross of the Military Order of Maria Theresa
Commanders of the Order of Saints Maurice and Lazarus
Burials at Lazarevskoe Cemetery (Saint Petersburg)